True Heroes (真心英雄) revolves around the daily lives of three police officers in a Neighbourhood Police Centre in Singapore. It stars Christopher Lee , Phyllis Quek , Allan Wu , Yvonne Lim & Jeanette Aw as the casts of the series. The show was endorsed by the Singapore Police Force, which opened up facilities such as the Old Police Academy and the Ang Mo Kio Police Division facilities, and loaned real police vehicles and equipment for filming purposes.

Plot
Real crimes such as the spider robber, VCD piracy, juvenile delinquency, gangsterism and cybercrime have been woven into this 25-episode action story. The police officers in the story stay alert daily to provide security to the civilians, making them the "True Heroes".

Chen Junhao (Christopher Lee) is a righteous and courageous police officer who was born into a family of police officers. Junhao graduated with top honours from the police academy and harbours the ambition to follow his father's footsteps into the elite Criminal Investigation Department. He is sorely disappointed when he learns that he has been assigned to a neighbourhood police centre. At the NPC, Junhao and his colleague Wang Feng (Allan Wu) do not see eye to eye and their relationship further deteriorates when Junhao accidentally mistakes Wang Feng's father for a robber and "arrests" him.

During a big fire, Junhao saves the life of an old lady, earning the adoration of the old lady's granddaughter, Irene (Yvonne Lim), who is the neighbourhood "ah lian". Much to Junhao's annoyance, Irene tries to come between him and his colleague-cum-love-interest, Kexin (Phyllis Quek).

Wang Feng falls for Junhao's sister Huimin, who attempts to patch up his relationship with his younger brother Wang Wei. He eventually changes his mind about Junhao when the latter saves him during a mission. Junhao also accepts Wang Feng after uncovering his troubled and complex family life.

Junhao's best friend uses his identity to commit multiple sex crimes and Junhao ends up taking the rap and is jailed. Kexin's younger sister has been kidnapped as revenge against her. Wang Feng witnesses the stabbing of his own younger brother, who eventually dies in his arms. Each officer is tested as their jobs soon catch up with their personal lives.

At the end, Huimin joins the Police Force as a Sergeant, whereas Kexin gets promoted to Staff Sergeant

Cast
Christopher Lee as SGT Chen Junhao
Phyllis Quek as SGT Cai Kexin
Allan Wu as SSGT Wang Feng
Yvonne Lim as Irene 
Jeanette Aw as Chen Huimin (Chen Junhao's sister)
Moses Lim as Chen Rongyao (Chen Junhao's father)
Zen Chong as Wang Wei (Wang Feng's younger brother)
Cavin Soh as Wu Zhiguang (Chen Junhao's friend)
Huang Wenyong as Wang Jiancheng (Wang Feng's father)
Lin Meijiao as Zhong Xiaolan (Wang Feng's mother)
Alan Tern as CPL Jiang Yijie
Li Wenhai as ASP Ge Ming
Jin Yinji as Chen Meizhen (Kexin's mother)
Chen Guohua as SGT Liu Zhenyang
Shaun Chen as Zhang Hanliang
Ye Shipin as Hui-ge (loanshark)
Joey Ng as Esther
Gary Yap as Mike
Li Yinzhu as Irene's grandmother
Zhang Yaodong as Peter (CID officer)

Accolades

External links
 
 True Heroes (English)

Singaporean crime television series
2000s Singaporean television series
2003 Singaporean television series debuts
2003 Singaporean television series endings
Channel 8 (Singapore) original programming